Serenata amara (t.l. Bitter serenade) is a 1952 Italian musical melodrama film.

Plot 
The film tells a story of friendship between two boxers, Mario (Claudio Villa) and Fabrizio (Walter Santesso), disturbed by their attraction for the same young girl, Anna Maria (Liliana Bonfatti).

Cast
 Claudio Villa as Mario
 Liliana Bonfatti as  Anna Maria
 Walter Santesso as Fabrizio
 Giovanna Pala as  Angela
 Gianni Rizzo as  Giuseppe
 Roberto Colangeli as Massimo
 Umberto Spadaro as  Music Teacher
 Ave Ninchi  as Mario's Mother
 Carlo Sposito  
 Nino Pavese

External links
 

1952 films
1950s Italian-language films
Films directed by Pino Mercanti
Melodrama films
Italian musical drama films
1950s musical drama films
Italian black-and-white films
1950s Italian films